Enslaved women were expected to maintain the enslaved populations, which led women to rebel against this expectation via contraception and abortions. Infanticide was also committed as a means to protect children from either becoming enslaved or from returning to enslavement.

Physical and sexual exploitation 
The ideologies surrounding the physical strength and fertility of African women were used to exploit African women throughout enslavement. While enslaved women were expected to perform manual labor equal to enslaved males, enslaved women were also expected to perform reproductive labor. For an enslaver, it was more profitable to produce his own enslaved population than it was to purchase enslaved people. This desire for profits and increases in land size led to forced enslaved breeding, either with other enslaved males or enslavers. While some enslaved women were able to select their male partners, others were denied the freedom of choice and had a male partner forced onto them. Whether or not the male partner had been selected by the enslaved women, it was still expected of her to birth as many children as possible in order to increase profits for the enslaver. Some enslavers also offered rewards for having additional children in order to encourage enslaved women to have children, enhancing the enslaver's profits. In consequence, rebellion by enslaved women sometimes took the form of acting against these expectations.

Contraception 

Contraception was an act of rebellion because it shifted the power and control from the enslaver to the enslaved. Since enslaved women were expected to maintain the enslaved populations, enslaved women used various methods to undermine this expectation. Abortions and contraceptives were also seen as a means for enslaved women to exercise agency over their bodies by allowing the women to control their ability to be impregnated. The peacock flower and the cotton root were plants that could be used as abortifacients. The use of cotton root was common, with other enslaved men worrying about their own population due to the high use of cotton root. In Maria Merian's Metamorphosis of the Insects of Surinam, she recorded that indigenous women used the plant to induce abortions. In the United States and Caribbean, both indigenous and enslaved women have used the peacock flower to abort pregnancies.  By taking contraception and abortifacients, enslaved women were denying enslavers authority over their bodies; by not having children, enslaved women were limiting the profits enslavers could make off their bodies.

Infanticide 

Infanticide was an act of rebellion because it allowed enslaved women to prevent the enslavement of their children. Due to partus sequitur ventrum, the principle that a child inherits the status of its mother, any child born to an enslaved woman would be born enslaved, part of the enslaver's property. Because of this notion, some enslaved women were caught between wanting their children both alive and dead. This led to some women committing infanticide to protect their children from a life of slavery. One of the more notable cases of infanticide is that of Margaret Garner. While fleeing north with her husband and their four children, the Garners were caught at one of the homes they were hiding in. Although Garner planned to kill her children and then herself, she managed to kill one of her daughters and injured the others when marshals stormed the house searching for the Garner family. Garner was put on trial and indicted for property damage. Her remaining children, husband, and herself were returned to her enslaver's brother in Louisiana.

Harriet Jacobs, a formerly enslaved woman who wrote about her experience, also had a traumatic motherhood experience. In her book, Incidents in the Life of a Slave Girl, Jacobs described how her owner threatened to take her children away from her if she didn't comply with his sexual advances. In the late Toni Morrison's book Beloved, she mentions that one of the enslaved women viewed her child as the only untouched aspect of herself. The child within her was not touched by enslavement and was the only clean aspect of her, so by committing infanticide, she was keeping that part of herself clean and untainted by enslavement.

See also
 Heritage
 African American genealogy
 Atlantic Creole
 Issue (genealogy)
 History
 Colonial American bastardy laws
 Female slavery in the United States
 History of sexual slavery in the United States
 Slavery in the colonial history of the United States
 Marriage and procreation
 Legitimacy (family law)
 Marriage of enslaved people (United States)
 Partus sequitur ventrem
 Plaçage, interracial common law marriages in French and Spanish America, including New Orleans
Sexual relations and rape
 Sexual slavery
 Slave breeding in the United States

References 

Sexual slavery
Slavery in the Caribbean
Slavery in the United States
Women in society
Black feminism
Violence against women in the United States
Abortion in the United States
American rebel slaves
Infanticide
Women in the Caribbean
American women slaves